The PVF-Cantada Beach Volleyball tournaments is a once-a-month-only beach volleyball (with no registration fees) invitational tournament for men's and women's organized by the Philippine Volleyball Federation (PVF) thru their President Edgardo "Boy" Cantada, Secretary General Karl Chan, Managing Director Otie Camangian (which served as the tournament director), and Deputy Secretary General Gerard Cantada. It is held at the Cantada Sports Center, in Bagumbayan, Taguig, with the world-class indoor and outdoor sand beach volleyball courts, therefore it is not opened to the public, with strictly invitational basis. The tournament is mainly supported by Tanduay under the helm of Lucio "Bong" Tan.

Cantada has been organizing beach volleyball tournaments and promoting the sport, since 2005. Several members of the Bagwis and Amihan teams (the national teams of PVF) were also joined in this tournament.

Developments
The PVF, thru its regional chapter based in the Cordillera Administrative Region, the Cordillera Volleyball Association, eyed for the staging of a national beach volleyball tournament to be held at the Baguio Athletic Bowl on March 5–6, 2016.

Results
August 3, 2014 (Tanduay Light Women’s Beach Volleyball Challenge 1st Leg)

November 9, 2014 (Tanduay Light Women’s Beach Volleyball Challenge 2nd Leg)

December 14, 2014 (Tanduay Light Women’s Beach Volleyball Challenge 3rd Leg)

March 1, 2015 (Tanduay Light Women’s Beach Volleyball Challenge 4th Leg)

July 19, 2015 (Tanduay PVF Beach Volleyball Invitational 1st Leg/Inauguration of the Indoor Beach Volleyball Sand Court)

Men's

Women's

September 19, 2015 (PVF Beach Volleyball Invitational 2nd Leg)

Men's

Women's

October 24, 2015 (PVF-Tanduay Beach Volleyball Invitational 3rd Leg)

Men's

Women's

December 5, 2015 (Tanduay-Summit Invitational Beach Volleyball 4th Leg)

Men's

Women's

See also
Philippine Volleyball Federation

External links
Venue's website

References

Beach volleyball competitions in the Philippines